Queen's Quarterly is a Canadian quarterly peer-reviewed academic journal of cultural studies that was established in 1893 by, among others, George Munro Grant, Sanford Fleming, and John Watson, all of Queen's University in Kingston, Ontario. The journal publishes articles, essays, reviews, short stories and poetry. It is abstracted and indexed in the Arts & Humanities Citation Index, Current Contents, MLA International Bibliography, and Abstracts of English Studies.

Editors 
The following persons have been editor-in-chief of the journal:
Duncan McArthur
Malcolm Ross
Glen Shortliffe
Kerry McSweeney
Boris Castel (1990–present)

References

External links 
 

Quarterly journals
Publications established in 1893
English-language journals
Cultural journals
Literary magazines published in Canada
1893 establishments in Canada